Collège Regina Assumpta (Regina Assumpta is Latin for "Assumption of the Queen") is a subsidized private, selective French-language school located in Montreal, Quebec, Canada, that was established in 1955 by the Sisters of Notre-Dame Congregation. The principal is Julie Duchesne. The financing principal is Marie-Andrée Delorme, the principal of pedagogical services is Julie Duchesne and the principal of the Culture and Sports Centre and principal of equipment is Christophe Bancilhon and the after school activities director is Stéphan Arbour. Although it used to be a school for Catholic girls, it is now open to children of all genders and of any religion.

Athletics 
The school is a member of the Quebec Student Sports Federation and it competes with many other private and public schools throughout Quebec. Sports offered at Collège Regina Assumpta include:
 Badminton
 Basketball
 Cheerleading
 Flag football
 Football
 Golf
 Swimming
 Volleyball
 Fencing
 Track and field (both indoor and outdoor)
 Ice hockey
 Soccer (only indoor)

Robotics 
A fundamental part of the school is the Robotics Team. In fact, the robotics team offered in Regina is one of, if not the best robotics program offered in any Canadian High School. The school offers a basic program to students from Secondary 1 to 3 but also has a FIRST Robotics Team that any robotics student can join as an extracurricular. Their FRC team is Team 3990 [T4K]. Their team has won many championships and regional and has been in the league since 2012.

Notable alumni 
 Julie Payette, astronaut for the Canadian Space Agency and 29th Governor General of Canada
 Louise Lecavalier, Canadian dancer and choreographer
 Louise Arbour, Canadian lawyer, prosecutor, jurist and UN Special Representative for International Migration
 Gabriel Nadeau-Dubois, co-spokesperson of Québec Solidaire, member of the National Assembly of Quebec representing Gouin and writer
 Mélanie Joly, Canadian lawyer, Minister of Foreign Affairs and Liberal member of the House of Commons of Canada representing Ahuntsic-Cartierville

References

External links 
 
 Robotics Website

High schools in Montreal
Ahuntsic-Cartierville
Private schools in Quebec
Educational institutions established in 1955
Catholic secondary schools in Quebec
Roman Catholic schools in Quebec
1955 establishments in Quebec